Horseshoe Lake State Park is an Illinois state park in Madison County, Illinois, United States. The park is located in southeastern Granite City, Illinois, just a  drive northeast of downtown St. Louis.

References

State parks of Illinois
Protected areas of Madison County, Illinois
Metro East